The 2016 Japanese Grand Prix (formally known as the 2016 Formula 1 Emirates Japanese Grand Prix) was a Formula One motor race that was held on 9 October 2016 at the Suzuka Circuit in Suzuka, Mie, Japan.

Mercedes driver Nico Rosberg entered the round with a twenty-three-point lead over teammate Lewis Hamilton in the World Drivers' Championship. Rosberg started the race from pole position and won the race, extending his championship lead to thirty-three points as Hamilton finished third behind Max Verstappen. Before the race, Mercedes held a 194-point lead over Red Bull Racing in the World Constructors' Championship, and with forty points for first and third places, secured their third consecutive title. In the Drivers' Championship, the field of title contenders narrowed to just two (Rosberg and Hamilton) after the race. This was Rosberg's 30th and final pole in Formula One as well as his 23rd and final Formula One victory.

Report

Background
Sebastian Vettel entered the race with a three-place grid penalty for his role in causing an avoidable collision on the opening lap of the previous race.

Race
Lewis Hamilton fell to 8th at the start of the race due to a bad start which was compounded by being on the wetter side of the grid. For the second year in succession in the Japanese Grand Prix, all entrants were classified as having finished the race.

After the race, Nico Rosberg had enough lead in the World Drivers' Championship to win the title, even if Hamilton won all the remaining 4 races and he finished in second place every time - with this scenario happening, Rosberg won the title with a narrow 5 points lead (385 points, compared to Hamilton's 380).

Classification

Qualifying

Notes
  – Kimi Räikkönen and Pascal Wehrlein received a five-place grid penalty for an unscheduled gearbox change.
  – Sebastian Vettel received a three-place grid penalty for causing an avoidable collision at the previous race in Malaysia.
  – Jenson Button received a thirty-five-place grid penalty for exceeding his quota of power unit components.

Race

Championship standings after the race
Bold text indicates who still had a theoretical chance of becoming World Champion.

Drivers' Championship standings

Constructors' Championship standings

 Note: Only the top five positions are included for the sets of standings.

References

External links

2016 Formula One races
2016
Grand Prix
Grand Prix